Savino is a surname, derived from the Italian name of Sabinus of Spoleto, a 3rd-century saint.  People with this surname include:

Alberto Savino, Italian footballer
Alessio di Savino, Italian boxer
Chris Savino, American animator, creator of The Loud House
Diane Savino, American politician 
Domenico Savino, Italian conductor later resided in the United States
Joseph J. Savino, American politician
Michele Savino, American shoemaker

See also
Saint-Savin (disambiguation)